The men's individual nordic combined competition for the 1994 Winter Olympics in Lillehammer at Lysgårdsbakken and Birkebeineren Ski Stadium on 18 and 19 February.

Results

Ski Jumping

Athletes did two normal hill ski jumps. The combined points earned on the jumps determined the starting order and times for the cross-country race; each point was equal to a 4-second deficit.

Cross-Country

The cross-country race was over a distance of 15 kilometres.

References

Nordic combined at the 1994 Winter Olympics